Paul Ayer (born April 6, 1998) is a Canadian ice dancer. With his skating partner, Alicia Fabbri, he is the 2019 Canadian national junior silver medalist and the 2019 Bavarian Open junior silver medalist. They placed in the top nine at the 2019 World Junior Championships.

Personal life
Ayer was born on April 6, 1998, in Calgary, Alberta. He is half Mexican-Canadian and speaks Spanish, French and English fluently. He has a younger brother named Alex. Ayer's father, who was a lawyer in Calgary, was diagnosed with early-onset Alzheimer's disease. He has taken online courses and plans to enroll in a university in Montreal in the future. Ayer hopes to practice his French in Montreal.

Ayer enjoys playing other sports with friends like football and hockey on outdoor rinks or lakes during the winter. He also enjoys travelling.

Career

Early career
Ayer began skating around 2007. He competed in only domestic events with his first three partners: Taylor Yanke, Nicola Salimova, and Jolie Che. Ayer and Che split at the end of the summer in 2017, and he spent about a year trying out with various partners before teaming up with Fabbri. He relocated from Calgary to Montreal to train full-time with Fabbri.

2018–2019 season: New partnership
Fabbri/Ayer were assigned to two Junior Grand Prix events in their first season together. They placed fourth at 2018 JGP Slovakia and seventh at 2018 JGP Slovenia.

Fabbri/Ayer placed second at the 2019 Canadian Championships behind Marjorie Lajoie / Zachary Lagha. Together, they were named to the Canadian team for the 2019 World Junior Championships in Zagreb, Croatia. At a tune-up event, the 2019 Bavarian Open, Fabbri/Ayer again won silver behind Lajoie/Lagha.

Fabbri/Ayer were thirteenth after the rhythm dance segment at the 2019 World Junior Championships but rallied with an eighth-place showing in the free dance to place ninth overall. Combined with Lajoie/Lagha's placement (first place), their rank qualified three ice dance spots for Canada at the 2020 World Junior Championships in Tallinn, Estonia.

2019–2020 season: New coaches
In July 2019, Fabbri/Ayer left coach Julien Lalonde to train with Marie-France Dubreuil, Patrice Lauzon, and Romain Haguenauer in Montreal. They made their senior international debut at the 2019 CS Warsaw Cup, where they placed sixth with personal bests in all segments.

2020–2021 season 
Fabbri/Ayer were assigned to make their Grand Prix debut at the 2020 Skate Canada International, but the event was cancelled as a result of the coronavirus pandemic.

With the pandemic continuing to make it difficult to hold in-person events, Fabbri/Ayer competed at virtual domestic competitions, placing fifth at the 2021 Skate Canada Challenge.  This result would have qualified them for the 2021 Canadian Championships, but they were cancelled due to the pandemic.

2021–2022 season 
Fabbri/Ayer returned to international competition after almost two years at the 2021 CS Lombardia Trophy, placing twelfth. Given a second Challenger assignment, they were fifth at the 2021 CS Cup of Austria.

At the 2022 Canadian Championships, held in a bubble in Ottawa due to Omicron variant restrictions, Fabbri/Ayer finished in seventh place overall after being hampered by a fall in the closing seconds of their rhythm dance.

2022–2023 season 
Skate Canada named Fabbri and Ayer to the senior national team for the first time in the lead-up to the new season. They ventured out internationally for the first time at the 2022 CS Budapest Trophy, where they finished in fourth place, 11.60 points behind bronze medalists Wolfkostin/Chen of the United States. Ayer assessed that they had given a "really strong performance in the rhythm dance and connected with the crowd," though faulting themselves for a free dance error. They were then invited to finally make the Grand Prix debut and came eighth at the 2022 MK John Wilson Trophy. Ayer dislocated his shoulder in the practice sessions at the Wilson Trophy and, while they were able to finish the event by making modifications to their program, it was subsequently determined that he required surgery. As a result, they withdrew from the 2023 Canadian Championships.

Programs

With Fabbri

Competitive highlights
GP: Grand Prix; CS: Challenger Series; JGP: Junior Grand Prix

With Fabbri

Detailed results
ISU personal bests highlighted in bold.  Small medals for rhythm and free dances awarded at ISU Championships only.

With Fabbri

Senior results

Junior results

References

External links 

 

1998 births
Canadian male ice dancers
Living people
Figure skaters from Calgary
21st-century Canadian people